Tyler Harrison Kinley (born January 31, 1991) is an American professional baseball pitcher for the Colorado Rockies of Major League Baseball (MLB). The Miami Marlins selected him in the 16th round of the 2013 MLB draft. He previously played for the Minnesota Twins and Miami Marlins.

Career

Miami Marlins
Kinley attended Nova High School in Davie, Florida, and Barry University, where he played college baseball for the Barry Buccaneers. The Miami Marlins selected Kinley in the 16th round of the 2013 MLB draft. He was limited by injuries during his time with the Marlins organization. After he signed with the Marlins, he spent the rest of the 2013 season with both the Gulf Coast Marlins of the Rookie-level Gulf Coast League and the Batavia Muckdogs of the Class A-Short Season New York-Penn League, pitching to a combined 0–1 win–loss record and 7.07 earned run average (ERA) in 14 innings pitched. He spent the 2014 season with the Greensboro Grasshoppers of the Class A South Atlantic League, compiling a 3–1 record and 2.70 ERA in 28 relief appearances. In 2015, Kinley played for the Jupiter Hammerheads of the Class A-Advanced Florida State League, pitching to a 1–3 record and 3.25 ERA in  innings.

In 2016, Kinley began the season with the Jacksonville Suns of the Class AA Southern League, where he pitched to a 3.96 ERA with 51 strikeouts in 50 innings. He was then promoted to the New Orleans Zephyrs of the Class AAA Pacific Coast League, but struggled in eight appearances. Kinley began the 2017 season Jacksonville, but pitched to a 5.19 ERA with the Jumbo Shrimp in 27 games. He was demoted to the Jupiter, where he had a 1.98 ERA. Through the end of the 2017 season, Kinley had recorded 212 strikeouts in  innings pitched in his minor league career.

Minnesota Twins

After the 2017 season, the Marlins opted not to protect Kinley on their 40-man roster. Kinley then pitched for the Tigres del Licey of the Dominican Winter League, where he had a 0.47 ERA and 32 strikeouts in 19 innings pitched. The Minnesota Twins selected him from the Marlins organization in the 2017 Rule 5 draft.

Kinley made the Twins' 2018 Opening Day 25-man roster. He allowed nine earned runs on nine hits, including two home runs with four strikeouts and four walks in  innings pitched for a 24.30 ERA before he was designated for assignment on April 26.

Return to the Marlins
The Twins returned Kinley to the Miami Marlins on May 1, 2018. He was assigned to New Orleans. The Marlins promoted him to the major leagues on September 4. Kinley pitched to a 3.65 ERA in  innings pitched in the 2019 season, while also allowing 36 walks.

Colorado Rockies
On December 9, 2019, Kinley was claimed off waivers by the Colorado Rockies from Miami. In 2020 with the Rockies, Kinley recorded a 5.32 ERA with a 9.9 K/9 in  innings pitched in 24 appearances. In 2021, Kinley pitched in a career-high 70 games for Colorado, posting a 3-2 record and 4.73 ERA with 68 strikeouts in 70.1 innings of work.

On June 15, 2022, magnetic resonance imaging showed that Kinley had a flexor tear in his right elbow. He underwent season-ending surgery later that month. On the year, he made 25 total appearances for Colorado, recording an excellent 0.75 ERA with 27 strikeouts in 24.0 innings pitched

On November 18, 2022, Kinley signed a three-year contract extension with a club option for 2026 with the Rockies.

Personal life
Kinley previously claimed to be related to William McKinley, the former President of the United States. However, a journalist who investigated his family history later reported that they were not related and traced Kinley's lineage back to farmers in North Carolina.

See also
Rule 5 draft results

References

External links

1991 births
Living people
People from Plantation, Florida
Baseball players from Florida
Major League Baseball pitchers
Minnesota Twins players
Miami Marlins players
Colorado Rockies players
Barry Buccaneers baseball players
Gulf Coast Marlins players
Batavia Muckdogs players
Greensboro Grasshoppers players
Jupiter Hammerheads players
Mesa Solar Sox players
Jacksonville Suns players
New Orleans Zephyrs players
Estrellas Orientales players
Jacksonville Jumbo Shrimp players
Tigres del Licey players
American expatriate baseball players in the Dominican Republic
New Orleans Baby Cakes players
Sportspeople from Broward County, Florida